Decoquinate is a quinolone coccidiostat used in veterinary medicine.

References

Further reading

 

Antiparasitic agents
4-Quinolones
Catechol ethers
Carboxylate esters
Ethyl esters